Cosmin Gabriel Matei (born 30 September 1991) is a Romanian professional footballer who plays as an attacking midfielder or a winger for Liga I club Sepsi OSK.

Matei started out his senior career at Farul Constanța in 2008, and has since represented Steaua București, Astra Ploiești, Dinamo București, Viitorul Constanța and Sepsi OSK in his native country. He also competed abroad in Greece, Turkey and Croatia, respectively.

Internationally, Matei earned caps for Romania at under-17, under-19 and under-21 levels, before making his full debut in May 2014.

Club career

Farul Constanța
Matei made his Liga I debut for Farul Constanța on 18 October 2008, in a match against Politehnica Timișoara.

Steaua București
Matei was transferred to Steaua București in July 2010. On 22 August, he recorded his league debut by coming on as a 85th-minute substitute for Romeo Surdu in a 3–0 win over Vaslui.

On 4 September 2010, Matei made his debut for Steaua's reserves in a Liga II game against Juventus București, entering in the 17th minute as they won 1–0.

Astra Ploiești
In June 2011, Matei was transferred to Astra Ploiești. He did not impress during his stint in Prahova County, appearing in only five matches without scoring.

Dinamo București
In August 2012, Matei penned down a five-year contract with Dinamo București, the cross-town rival of his former club Steaua. He scored his first goal in a game against Universitatea Cluj, on 2 May that year.

Atromitos
In January 2016, Matei moved abroad for the first time after joining Greek club Atromitos for an undisclosed transfer fee.

Gençlerbirliği
On 10 August 2016, Süper Lig side Gençlerbirliği announced the signing of Matei on a three-year deal.

Viitorul Constanța
On 26 August 2019, Matei returned to Romania by agreeing to a two-year contract with Viitorul Constanța.

Return to Dinamo București
In September 2021, Matei returned to Dinamo București as one of the experienced players in a youth-oriented squad. After several unconvincing performances, he was excluded from the first team in December 2021 by manager Mircea Rednic. He resumed trainings the following month after Rednic's dismissal, but Dinamo continued its poor results which led to the first relegation in the club history.

Matei became the first player to depart Dinamo after the relegation, only three days after featuring 73 minutes in the decisive promotion/relegation play-off match against Universitatea Cluj.

Sepsi OSK
On 2 June 2022, shortly after Dinamo București's relegation, Matei remained in the Liga I by signing a two-year contract with Sepsi OSK. He made his debut on 9 July, in a 2–1 victory over CFR Cluj in the Supercupa României.

International career
Matei made his debut for the Romania national team in a friendly against Albania played in Switzerland, in May 2014.

Career statistics

Club

International

Honours
Steaua București
Cupa României: 2010–11

Dinamo București
Cupa României: 2011–12
Supercupa României: 2012

Sepsi OSK
Supercupa României: 2022

References

External links
 
 
 

1991 births
Living people
Sportspeople from Târgoviște
Romanian footballers
Association football midfielders
Liga I players
FCV Farul Constanța players
FC Steaua București players
FC Astra Giurgiu players
FC Dinamo București players
Super League Greece players
Atromitos F.C. players
Süper Lig players
TFF First League players
Gençlerbirliği S.K. footballers
Croatian Football League players
NK Istra 1961 players
FC Viitorul Constanța players
Sepsi OSK Sfântu Gheorghe players
Romania youth international footballers
Romania under-21 international footballers
Romania international footballers
Romanian expatriate footballers
Expatriate footballers in Greece
Romanian expatriate sportspeople in Greece
Expatriate footballers in Turkey
Romanian expatriate sportspeople in Turkey
Expatriate footballers in Croatia
Romanian expatriate sportspeople in Croatia